"Afterlife" is a song by Canadian indie rock band Arcade Fire. It was released on September 28, 2013, as a single from the band's fourth studio album, Reflektor. The song was debuted on Saturday Night Live.

Music videos
The music video for the song was released on November 21, 2013. The short film, directed by Emily Kai Bock and notably shot with a mix of 35mm and 65mm film, depicts a Latino family in Los Angeles, California, dreaming of their missing mother.

The video won the 2014 Prism Prize.

The band also performed a live video, streamed on YouTube at the YouTube Music Awards in November 2013. It was directed by Spike Jonze.

An official live performance video was also released in April 2014 on the band's YouTube channel.

Scenes from the film Black Orpheus were used in the official lyric videos.

Live performances
The band performed "Afterlife" at Saturday Night Live, The Tonight Show Starring Jimmy Fallon, and The Graham Norton Show. The song was performed live on every show of the Reflektor tour.

Chart performance

References

2013 singles
2013 songs
Arcade Fire songs
Franglais songs
Merge Records singles
Song recordings produced by James Murphy (electronic musician)
Song recordings produced by Markus Dravs
Music videos directed by Spike Jonze
Songs written by William Butler (musician)
Songs written by Win Butler
Songs written by Régine Chassagne
Songs written by Jeremy Gara
Songs written by Tim Kingsbury
Songs written by Richard Reed Parry